Matteo Villani (born 29 August 1982) is an Italian steeplechase runner.

Biography
Villani was born in San Secondo Parmense, Parma. He represented Italy at the 2008 Summer Olympics in Beijing, and competed in the men's 3000 m steeplechase. He ran in the first heat of the event, against twelve other competitors, including France's Bouabdellah Tahri and Kenya's Brimin Kipruto (who eventually won the gold medal in the final), but did not finish the entire race. Villani also achieved his personal best time of 8:21.73, at a meeting in Heusden-Zolder, Belgium.

National titles
Villani has won the individual national championships twice.
2 wins in 3000 metres steeplechase (2009, 2012)

See also
 Italian all-time lists - 3000 metres steeplechase

References

External links
 

Italian male steeplechase runners
Olympic athletes of Italy
Athletes (track and field) at the 2008 Summer Olympics
Sportspeople from Parma
1982 births
Living people
Athletics competitors of Centro Sportivo Carabinieri